This is a list of cases reported in volume 77 (10 Wall.) of United States Reports, decided by the Supreme Court of the United States from 1869 to 1871.

Nominative reports 
In 1874, the U.S. government created the United States Reports, and retroactively numbered older privately-published case reports as part of the new series.  As a result, cases appearing in volumes 1–90 of U.S. Reports have dual citation forms; one for the volume number of U.S. Reports, and one for the volume number of the reports named for the relevant reporter of decisions (these are called "nominative reports").

John William Wallace 
Starting with the 66th volume of U.S. Reports, the Reporter of Decisions of the Supreme Court of the United States was John William Wallace. Wallace was Reporter of Decisions from 1863 to 1874, covering volumes 68 through 90 of United States Reports which correspond to volumes 1 through 23 of his Wallace's Reports. As such, the dual form of citation to, for example,   is 77 U.S. (10 Wall.) 544 (1870).

Wallace's Reports were the final nominative reports for the US Supreme Court; starting with volume 91, cases were identified simply as "(volume #) U.S. (page #) (year)".

Justices of the Supreme Court at the time of 77 U.S. (10 Wall.) 

The Supreme Court is established by Article III, Section 1 of the Constitution of the United States, which says: "The judicial Power of the United States, shall be vested in one supreme Court . . .". The size of the Court is not specified; the Constitution leaves it to Congress to set the number of justices. Under the Judiciary Act of 1789 Congress originally fixed the number of justices at six (one chief justice and five associate justices). Since 1789 Congress has varied the size of the Court from six to seven, nine, ten, and back to nine justices (always including one chief justice).

To prevent President Andrew Johnson from appointing any justices, a hostile Congress passed the Judicial Circuits Act of 1866, eliminating three of the ten seats from the Supreme Court as they became vacant, and so potentially reducing the size of the court to seven justices. The vacancy caused by the death of Justice John Catron in 1865 had not been filled, so after Justice James Moore Wayne died in July 1867 there were eight justices left on the court at the start of the term when the cases in 77 U.S. (10 Wall.) were decided; however Justice Robert Cooper Grier resigned at the end of January 1870, temporarily reducing the Court to seven justices. Newly-confirmed justices William Strong and Joseph P. Bradley joined the Court in March 1870, in the final weeks of the session. This brought the Court back to nine justices, the number set by the Judiciary Act of 1869.

Fluctuations in Supreme Court membership, 1864-1870

Justices during at least part of the Court session reported in 77 U.S. (10 Wall.)

Notable Cases in 77 U.S. (10 Wall.)

Slaughter-House Cases
The Slaughter-House Cases,          77 U.S. (10 Wall.) 273 (1870)  were consolidated cases pertaining to the scope of the Fourteenth Amendment to the United States Constitution.  The Supreme Court held that the Privileges or Immunities Clause of the Fourteenth Amendment only protects legal rights associated with federal U.S. citizenship, but not those that pertain to state citizenship. In effect, the clause was interpreted to convey limited protection pertinent only to a small number of rights, such as the right to seek federal office.  The Slaughter-House Cases essentially "gutted" the Privileges or Immunities Clause.  In 1953, the American scholar Edward Samuel Corwin remarked: "Unique among constitutional provisions, the privileges and immunities clause of the Fourteenth Amendment enjoys the distinction of having been rendered a practical nullity by a single decision of the Supreme Court rendered within five years after its ratification."

Citation style 

Under the Judiciary Act of 1789 the federal court structure at the time comprised District Courts, which had general trial jurisdiction; Circuit Courts, which had mixed trial and appellate (from the US District Courts) jurisdiction; and the United States Supreme Court, which had appellate jurisdiction over the federal District and Circuit courts—and for certain issues over state courts. The Supreme Court also had limited original jurisdiction (i.e., in which cases could be filed directly with the Supreme Court without first having been heard by a lower federal or state court). There were one or more federal District Courts and/or Circuit Courts in each state, territory, or other geographical region.

Bluebook citation style is used for case names, citations, and jurisdictions.  
 e.g.,"C.C.D.N.J." = United States Circuit Court for the District of New Jersey
 e.g.,"D. Mass." = United States District Court for the District of Massachusetts 
 "E." = Eastern; "M." = Middle; "N." = Northern; "S." = Southern; "W." = Western
 e.g.,"C.C.S.D.N.Y." = United States Circuit Court for the Southern District of New York
 e.g.,"M.D. Ala." = United States District Court for the Middle District of Alabama
 "Ct. Cl." = United States Court of Claims
 The abbreviation of a state's name alone indicates the highest appellate court in that state's judiciary at the time. 
 e.g.,"Pa." = Supreme Court of Pennsylvania
 e.g.,"Me." = Supreme Judicial Court of Maine

List of cases in 77 U.S. (10 Wall.)

Notes and references

See also
certificate of division

External links
  Case reports in volume 77 (10 Wall.) from Library of Congress
  Case reports in volume 77 (10 Wall.) from Court Listener
  Case reports in volume 77 (10 Wall.) from the Caselaw Access Project of Harvard Law School
  Case reports in volume 77 (10 Wall.) from Google Scholar
  Case reports in volume 77 (10 Wall.) from Justia
  Case reports in volume 77 (10 Wall.) from Open Jurist
 Website of the United States Supreme Court
 United States Courts website about the Supreme Court
 National Archives, Records of the Supreme Court of the United States
 American Bar Association, How Does the Supreme Court Work?
 The Supreme Court Historical Society

1869 in United States case law
1870 in United States case law
1871 in United States case law